Sir Edwin Forsyth Stockton  (18 March 1873 – 4 December 1939) was a British industrialist and Conservative MP for Manchester Exchange. He won the seat in 1922, but lost it to the Liberals in 1923.

Stockton was a member of the Cotton Control Board from 1916 to 1919.

Sources
 , p. 187
Whitaker's Almanack, 1923 and 1923 editions

External links
His contributions in Parliament

Conservative Party (UK) MPs for English constituencies
Politicians from Manchester
Knights Bachelor
1873 births
1939 deaths
British industrialists